The Kyōto Daishōten is a Japanese Grade 2 flat horse race in Japan for Thoroughbred colts and fillies aged three and over run over a distance of 2,400 metres at the Kyoto Racecourse, Fushimi-ku, Kyoto.

The race is run in October and serves as a trial race for the autumn edition of the Tenno Sho.

It was first run in 1966. Among the winners of the race have been Mejiro McQueen, Marvelous Crown, T M Opera O, Tap Dance City, Rose Kingdom and Lovely Day.

Records
Speed record:
2:22.9 Hit The Target 2013

Most successful horse (2 wins):
 Tanino Chikara – 1973, 1974
 Yamano Shiragiku – 1983, 1985
 Suzuka Koban – 1984, 1986
 Super Creek – 1989, 1990
 Mejiro McQueen – 1991, 1993
 T M Opera O – 2000, 2001

Winners since 1994 

The 2021 and 2022 runnings took place at Hanshin while Kyoto was closed for redevelopment.

Earlier winners

 1966 - Kyoei Hikari
 1967 - Shibafuji
 1968 - Marchs
 1969 - Finis
 1970 - New Kiminonawa
 1971 - Mejiro Asama
 1972 - Kimusu Vimy
 1973 - Tanino Chikara
 1974 - Tanino Chikara
 1975 - Ishino Masaru
 1976 - Passing Venture
 1977 - Ten Point
 1978 - Ryu Kiko
 1979 - Tenmei
 1980 - Silksky
 1981 - Inado Kotobuki
 1982 - Mejiro Chara
 1983 - Yamano Shiragiku
 1984 - Suzuka Koban
 1985 - Yamano Shiragiku
 1986 - Suzuka Koban
 1987 - Tokai Roman
 1988 - Meisho Eikan
 1989 - Super Creek
 1990 - Super Creek
 1991 - Mejiro McQueen
 1992 - Osumi Roch
 1993 - Mejiro McQueen

See also
 Horse racing in Japan
 List of Japanese flat horse races

References

Turf races in Japan